Žice is a dispersed settlement in the Municipality of Sveta Ana in the Slovene Hills in northeastern Slovenia.

References

External links
Žice on Geopedia

Populated places in the Municipality of Sveta Ana